The Puri–Durg Express is an Express train belonging to East Coast Railway zone that runs between  and  in India. It is currently being operated with 18425/18426 train numbers on a daily basis. This train was introduced as Bhubaneswar–Raipur express in 2006. In 2010 it was extended to Puri and Durg.

Service

The 18425/Puri–Durg Express has an average speed of 46 km/hr and covers 797 km in 17h 10m.
The 18426/Durg–Puri Express has an average speed of 47 km/hr and covers 797 km in 17h.

Route and halts 

The important halts of the train are:

Coach composition

The train has standard LHB rakes with a max speed of 110 kmph. The train consists of 20 coaches:

 1 First AC 
 2 AC II Tier
 2 AC III Tier
 8 Sleeper coaches
 5 General Unreserved
 2 Seating cum Luggage Rake

Traction

Both trains are hauled by a Visakhapatnam Loco Shed-based WAP-4 electric locomotive from Durg to Titlagarh Junction. From Titlagarh Junction, trains are hauled by a Raipur Loco Shed-based WDP-4D diesel locomotive up to Puri.

Direction reversal

The train reverses its direction 2 times:

See also 

 Durg Junction railway station
 Puri railway station

Notes

References

External links 

 18425/Puri - Durg Express India Rail Info
 18426/Durg - Puri Express India Rail Info

Transport in Durg
Transport in Puri
Express trains in India
Rail transport in Chhattisgarh
Rail transport in Odisha